Maria Regina High School, commonly referred to as Maria or MRHS, is an American Catholic, college-preparatory high school (grades 9–12) for girls founded by the Sisters of the Resurrection, located in Hartsdale, New York.

History
In 1957, Maria Regina High School was proposed by Francis Cardinal Spellman and the Sisters of the Resurrection were tasked with founding the first archdiocesan girls’ high school in Westchester County.

On February 2, 1959, Maria Regina's first freshman and sophomore classes entered.

Admission
School admission is determined through the student's results on the TACHS test.  The school  also looks at the student's academic record for the 6th, 7th, and 8th grades, and results on standardized examinations for the 6th and 7th grades.

Scholarships
The school offers several partial scholarships and one full scholarship, all of which are awarded based on the results of the TACHS examination.  The highest scorers who put Maria Regina as their first choice receive the scholarships.  For this scholarship to be renewed every year, the student must have an overall average greater than 90 percent at the end of each academic year. Students who are awarded scholarships tend to be placed in honors classes.

Academics
The school offers a rigorous college preparatory program.  Graduation requires successful completion of the four-year course of study.  A total of at least 26 credits is required.  The Maria Regina program includes four years of mathematics, English, social studies, and theology; three years of science and a foreign language; and one year of art and music, although many students opt to take four years of science and a foreign language, and more than one year of art.  Physical education and health are requirements for graduation. Honors classes are available in all disciplines, except theology, and AP classes are offered in classes including biology, chemistry, English literature, American history, and European history. There is a wide variety of electives to choose from for juniors and seniors, such as introduction to law, 3D printing, and criminal justice.

The school sponsors the College Link Program, in which college courses offered at Iona College and St. Thomas Aquinas College can be taken by Maria Regina students.  Students enrolled in this program have the opportunity to earn college credits that can be transferred to their colleges of choice.

The school has two wireless computer labs with a total of fifty computer workstations and a high-speed laser-jet printer.  There are 15 computer workstations in the library and another laser-jet printer.  There are 18 SMARTboards in classrooms through the building.

Clubs and organizations

Athletics
Maria Regina High School is an active member in the Catholic High School Athletic Association. Other member high schools include Cardinal Spellman, Mt. St. Ursula, Preston, and Sacred Heart.  

All Maria Regina teams compete in non-conference tournaments, games, and matches so that the schedules are highly competitive.
Athletes are required to successfully complete and maintain the same courseload as other students.  Over one-fourth of the student body participates in interscholastic after-school athletics programs.

Notable alumni 
 Betty Broderick, convicted murderer
 Mary Calvi, television journalist
 Linda Lovelace, pornographic actress

References

External links
 , the school's official website

1957 establishments in New York (state)
Catholic secondary schools in New York (state)
Educational institutions established in 1957
Girls' schools in New York (state)
Greenburgh, New York
Private high schools in Westchester County, New York